The Vladimirov diaries: Yenan, China, 1942-1945 was a book written by Peter Vladimirov; it was published by his son Yury Vlasov in 1973, twenty years after Vladimirov's death. The book recounts the events in Yan'an during the Second World War, particularly information on Mao Zedong. 

Vladimirov died in 1953.  His son Yury Vlasov edited his diaries and published the book in 1973. It was then translated to a local language and reprinted in Vietnam (1973), India (1974), United States (1975), Japan (1975), Czechoslovakia (1975), Taiwan (1976), East Germany (1976) and China (2004). The diary was personally supervised by Yury Andropov; it has been criticized in mainland China as having been edited for Soviet propaganda purposes. It is censored by the Great Firewall.

References

1973 non-fiction books
China–Soviet Union relations
Comintern
Doubleday (publisher) books